Mark Wagner (born 1976) is an American artist best known for meticulous collages made of United States banknotes, such as the portrait of Federal Reserve Bank Chairman Ben Bernanke, composed exclusively of one-dollar bills, in the collection of the Smithsonian Institution's National Portrait Gallery. He is co-founder of The Booklyn Artist Alliance and has published over twenty artists’ books with Bird Brain Press and X-ing Books.

Currency collage 
Since 1999, Wagner has been using US banknotes to create portraits, abstractions, allegories, still lifes, and sculptures ranging in size from 2x3 inch smiling and frowning parodies of Gilbert Stuart’s portrait of George Washington on the dollar, to the 17x3 feet Liberty, a 2009 depiction of the Statue of Liberty using slices from over 1000 dollar bills. Lisa Dennison, Chief Curator of the Solomon R. Guggenheim Museum in New York City commends Wagner's “witty and intricately detailed” work and situates his art in the longstanding tradition of artists like Ed Ruscha who adapt pre-existing resources to create uniquely engaging works of art.  Detractors say the work can lean towards the gimmicky.

Collections 

Bibliothèque nationale de France, Paris
Boston Public Library, Boston, MA
Brooklyn Museum of Art, Brooklyn, NY
Corcoran Gallery of Art, Washington, DC
Getty Center for the History of Art and Humanities, Los Angeles, CA
Library of Congress, Washington, DC
Metropolitan Museum of Art, NYC
Minneapolis Institute of Art, Minneapolis, MN
Museum of Modern Art (MoMA), NYC
New York Public Library, NYC
Rhode Island School of Design, Providence, RI
San Francisco Museum of Modern Art, San Francisco, CA
Smithsonian Institution, Washington, DC
Stanford University, Palo Alto, CA
Walker Art Center, Minneapolis, MN
Whitney Museum of American Art, NYC

Exhibitions 
Wagner has had a number of solo exhibitions and participated in many group exhibitions.

Pavel Zoubok Gallery, NYC (2013, 2011, 2008) - solo exhibitions
Central Academy of Fine Arts Museum, Beijing, China (2012)
National Portrait Gallery, Smithsonian Institution, Washington, DC (2011)
Ronald Feldman Fine Art, NYC (2010)
Walker Art Center, Minneapolis, MN (2009)
Albright-Knox Art Gallery, Buffalo, NY (2009)
FLAG Art Foundation, NYC (2008)
Getty Center for the History of Art and Humanities, Los Angeles, CA (2005)
Renaissance Society / University of Chicago, IL (2004)
Parsons School of Design, NYC (2003) - solo exhibition
Yale University, New Haven, CT (2002)
Brooklyn Museum of Art, NY (2000)
Metropolitan Museum of Art, NYC (2000)

Publication 

Pacific Standard Magazine, "The King of Cash," cover image, Nov., 2013
WSJ Money Magazine, "A Yen for Art,” Mar. 9, 2013
Harvard Business Review Russia, cover image and artwork, United Press, 2012
The Baffler, No 19, artwork, MIT Press, Mar. 2012
New York State lottery advertising campaign, “Money Multiplier,” Nov. 2012
Wall Street Journal, "Mark Wagner: Give Me Liberty or Give Me Death" Lance Esplund, Aug. 6, 2011
Huffington Post, "The New Moneyed Art" Adrian Brune, Aug. 4, 2011
"Paper Promises," novel by Philip Coggan, cover image, Penguin UK, 2011
Hyperallergic, "The Phantoms of Liberty" Howard Hurst, Jul. 13, 2011
Newsweek, cover image, "The Capitalist Manifesto," Fareed Zakaria, Jun. 22, 2009
Harpers Magazine, "Infinite Debt," Thomas Geoghegan, Apr. 2009
Morning News, "Million Dollar Babies," Nicole Pasulka, Apr. 6, 2009
New York Times, "Collages Go to College, And Behave Accordingly,” Benj. Genocchio, Dec. 16, 2007
The New York Times, "Money Changes Everything,” Ken Johnson, Jul. 14, 2006
Chicago Reader, "Well-Worn Text," Nov. 29, 1996

Other coverage
http://www.nydailynews.com/new-york/artist-mark-wagner-dollar-bills-million-dollar-message-article-1.1468470
http://www.huffingtonpost.com/adrian-margaret-brune/the-new-moneyed-art_b_918483.html?
http://hyperallergic.com/29363/the-phantoms-of-liberty/
http://paradigmmagazine.com/2011/12/12/paradigm-magazine-mark-wagner-interview/
http://blog.library.si.edu/2012/07/concealed-in-the-rising-smoke/#.UqSRJiecxBk
http://www.worldcat.org/search?q=au%3ABird+Brain+Press.&qt=hot_author
http://www.thisiscolossal.com/2013/08/mark-wagner-currency/

See also 

Statue of Liberty in popular culture
J. S. G. Boggs

References

External links 
http://artsy.net/artist/mark-wagner
Artists website
. A P.F. Pictures short of the artist at work.

1976 births
Living people
University of Wisconsin–Madison alumni
American artists
Banknotes of the United States
Collage artists